is Misia's 4th single. It was released on November 25, 1999 simultaneously with Sweetness. It peaked at #4 selling 119,630 copies on its first week. The song was used as the image song for Hitachi Maxell's "True Sound".

Track list

Charts

External links
http://www.rhythmedia.co.jp/misia/disc/ — Misia discography

1999 singles
Misia songs
1999 songs
Arista Records singles
Songs written by Misia